Myn Bala (Jaujürek myñ bala) is a 2011 Kazakhstani historical dramatic film depicting the eighteenth century war fought between the Kazakhs and the Dzungar Khanate. The film was made to commemorate the 20th anniversary of Kazakhstan's independence from the Soviet Union. Its production cost over $7 million (USD).

The film was selected as the Kazakhstani entry for the Best Foreign Language Film at the 85th Academy Awards, but it did not make the final shortlist.

See also
 List of Asian historical drama films
 List of submissions to the 85th Academy Awards for Best Foreign Language Film
 List of Kazakhstani submissions for the Academy Award for Best Foreign Language Film

References

External links

2011 films
Kazakhstani historical drama films
2011 war drama films
2010s historical drama films
Kazakh-language films
Films set in Kazakhstan
Films set in the 18th century
Films about rebellions
2011 drama films
Kazakhstani war drama films